The San Jose Conservation Corps is a youth job training and education program in San Jose, California. The program serves youth 17.5–27 years of age who desire job training and/or completion of their high school diploma.

About
Founded in 1987, the SJCC has provided more than 17,000 "at-risk" disadvantaged young men and women with academic education, hands-on learning, and development of basic skills. These skills include leadership, communication, computer literacy, and employment training which will help them to advance and excel in their future and careers. The SJCC offers secondary education courses through its on-site charter school and vocational education and job training through its Projects and Recycling Departments. The San Jose Conservation Corps & Charter School is a non-profit organization that provides youth with a quality high school education and teaches valuable work and life skills that empower them to become responsible, productive, and caring citizens.

The San Jose Conservation Corps has four divisions: the Charter School/Academy, Environmental Projects, Recycling, and  Food Security.

References

External links
San Jose Charter School page

Education in San Jose, California
1987 establishments in California